Syncopacma montanata is a moth of the family Gelechiidae. It was described by László Anthony Gozmány in 1957. It is found in France, Italy, Romania and Ukraine.

References

Moths described in 1957
Syncopacma